An illuminated manuscript is a formally prepared document where the text is often supplemented with flourishes such as borders and miniature illustrations. Often used in the Roman Catholic Church for prayers, liturgical services and psalms, the practice continued into secular texts from the 13th century onward and typically include proclamations, enrolled bills, laws, charters, inventories and deeds.

While Islamic manuscripts can also be called illuminated, and use essentially the same techniques, comparable Far Eastern and Mesoamerican works are described as painted.

The earliest illuminated manuscripts in existence come from the Kingdom of the Ostrogoths and the Eastern Roman Empire and date from between 400 and 600 CE. Examples include the Codex Argenteus and the Rossano Gospels, both of which are from the 6th century. The majority of extant manuscripts are from the Middle Ages, although many survive from the Renaissance, along with a very limited number from Late Antiquity.

Most medieval manuscripts, illuminated or not, were written on parchment or vellum. These pages were then bound into books, called codices (singular: codex). A very few illuminated fragments also survive on papyrus. Books ranged in size from ones smaller than a modern paperback, such as the pocket gospel, to very large ones such as choirbooks for choirs to sing from, and "Atlantic" bibles, requiring more than one person to lift them.

Paper manuscripts appeared during the Late Middle Ages. Very early printed books left spaces for red text, known as rubrics, miniature illustrations and illuminated initials, all of which would have been added later by hand. Drawings in the margins (known as marginalia) would also allow scribes to add their own notes, diagrams, translations, and even comic flourishes.

The introduction of printing rapidly led to the decline of illumination. Illuminated manuscripts continued to be produced in the early 16th century but in much smaller numbers, mostly for the very wealthy. They are among the most common items to survive from the Middle Ages; many thousands survive. They are also the best surviving specimens of medieval painting, and the best preserved. Indeed, for many areas and time periods, they are the only surviving examples of painting.

History

Art historians classify illuminated manuscripts into their historic periods and types, including (but not limited to) Late Antique, Insular, Carolingian manuscripts, Ottonian manuscripts, Romanesque manuscripts, Gothic manuscripts, and Renaissance manuscripts. There are a few examples from later periods. The type of book most often heavily and richly illuminated is sometimes known as a "display book." In the first millennium, these were most likely to be Gospel Books, such as the Lindisfarne Gospels and the Book of Kells. The Romanesque and Gothic periods saw the creation of many large illuminated complete bibles. The largest surviving example of these is The Codex Gigas in Sweden; it is so massive that it takes three librarians to lift it.

Other illuminated liturgical books appeared during and after the Romanesque period. These included Psalters, and small, personal devotional books known as Books of Hours. These items were often richly illuminated with miniatures, decorated initials and floral borders. They were costly and therefore only owned by wealthy patrons.

As the production of manuscripts shifted from monasteries to the public sector during the High Middle Ages, illuminated books began to reflect secular interests. These included short stories, legends of the saints, tales of chivalry, mythological stories, and even accounts of criminal, social or miraculous occurrences. Some of these were also freely used by storytellers and itinerant actors to support their plays.

The Byzantine world produced manuscripts in its own style, versions of which spread to other Orthodox and Eastern Christian areas. With their traditions of literacy uninterrupted by the Middle Ages, the Muslim World, especially on the Iberian Peninsula, was instrumental in delivering ancient classic works to the growing intellectual circles and universities of Western Europe throughout the 12th century. Books were produced there in large numbers and on paper for the first time in Europe, and with them full treatises on the sciences, especially astrology and medicine where illumination was required to have profuse and accurate representations with the text.

The Gothic period, which generally saw an increase in the production of illuminated books, also saw more secular works such as chronicles and works of literature illuminated. Wealthy people began to build up personal libraries; Philip the Bold probably had the largest personal library of his time in the mid-15th century, is estimated to have had about 600 illuminated manuscripts, whilst a number of his friends and relations had several dozen.  Wealthy patrons, however, could have personal prayer books made especially for them, usually in the form of richly illuminated "books of hours," which set down prayers appropriate for various times in the liturgical day. One of  the best known examples is the extravagant Très Riches Heures du Duc de Berry for a French prince.

Up to the 12th century, most manuscripts were produced in monasteries in order to add to the library or after receiving a commission from a wealthy patron. Larger monasteries often contained separate areas for the monks who specialized in the production of manuscripts called a scriptorium. Within the walls of a scriptorium were individualized areas where a monk could sit and work on a manuscript without being disturbed by his fellow brethren. If no scriptorium was available, then "separate little rooms were assigned to book copying; they were situated in such a way that each scribe had to himself a window open to the cloister walk."

By the 14th century, the cloisters of monks writing in the scriptorium had almost fully given way to commercial urban scriptoria, especially in Paris, Rome and the Netherlands. While the process of creating an illuminated manuscript did not change, the move from monasteries to commercial settings was a radical step. Demand for manuscripts grew to an extent that Monastic libraries began to employ secular scribes and illuminators. These individuals often lived close to the monastery and, in instances, dressed as monks whenever they entered the monastery, but were allowed to leave at the end of the day. In reality, illuminators were often well known and acclaimed and many of their identities have survived.

Techniques 

Illumination was a complex and costly process, and was therefore usually reserved for special books such as altar bibles, or books for royalty.  In the early Middle Ages, most books were produced in monasteries, whether for their own use, for presentation, or for a commission. However, commercial scriptoria grew up in large cities, especially Paris, and in Italy and the Netherlands, and by the late 14th century there was a significant industry producing manuscripts, including agents who would take long-distance commissions, with details of the heraldry of the buyer and the saints of personal interest to him (for the calendar of a book of hours). By the end of the period, many of the painters were women, perhaps especially in Paris.

Text 
The type of script depended on local customs and tastes. In England, for example, Textura was widely used from the 12th to 16th centuries, while a cursive hand known as Anglicana emerged around 1260 for business documents. In the Frankish Empire, Carolingian minuscule emerged under the vast educational program of Charlemagne.

The first step was to send the manuscript to a rubricator, "who added (in red or other colors) the titles, headlines, the initials of chapters and sections, the notes and so on; and then – if the book was to be illustrated – it was sent to the illuminator". These letters and notes would be applied using an ink-pot and either a sharpened quill feather or a reed pen. In the case of manuscripts that were sold commercially, the writing would "undoubtedly have been discussed initially between the patron and the scribe (or the scribe's agent,) but by the time that the written gathering were sent off to the illuminator there was no longer any scope for innovation."

The sturdy Roman letters of the early Middle Ages gradually gave way to scripts such as Uncial and half-Uncial, especially in the British Isles, where distinctive scripts such as insular majuscule and insular minuscule developed. Stocky, richly textured blackletter was first seen around the 13th century and was particularly popular in the later Middle Ages. Prior to the days of such careful planning, "A typical black-letter page of these Gothic years would show a page in which the lettering was cramped and crowded into a format dominated by huge ornamented capitals that descended from uncial forms or by illustrations". To prevent such poorly made manuscripts and illuminations from occurring, a script was typically supplied first, "and blank spaces were left for the decoration. This presupposes very careful planning by the scribe even before he put pen to parchment."

Engrossing: The process of illumination 

The following steps outline the detailed labor involved to create the illuminations of one page of a manuscript:
 Silverpoint drawing of the design is executed
 Burnished gold dots are applied
 Application of modulating colors
 Continuation of previous three steps in addition to outlining marginal figures
 Penning of a rinceau appearing in the border of page
 Finally, marginal figures are painted

The illumination and decoration was normally planned at the inception of the work, and space reserved for it. However, the text was usually written before illumination began. In the Early Medieval period the text and illumination were often done by the same people, normally monks, but by the High Middle Ages the roles were typically separated, except for routine initials and flourishes, and by at least the 14th century there were secular workshops producing manuscripts, and by the beginning of the 15th century these were producing most of the best work, and were commissioned even by monasteries. When the text was complete, the illustrator set to work. Complex designs were planned out beforehand, probably on wax tablets, the sketch pad of the era. The design was then traced or drawn onto the vellum (possibly with the aid of pinpricks or other markings, as in the case of the Lindisfarne Gospels). Many incomplete manuscripts survive from most periods, giving us a good idea of working methods.

At all times, most manuscripts did not have images in them. In the early Middle Ages, manuscripts tend to either be display books with very full illumination, or manuscripts for study with at most a few decorated initials and flourishes. By the Romanesque period many more manuscripts had decorated or historiated initials, and manuscripts essentially for study often contained some images, often not in color. This trend intensified in the Gothic period, when most manuscripts had at least decorative flourishes in places, and a much larger proportion had images of some sort. Display books of the Gothic period in particular had very elaborate decorated borders of foliate patterns, often with small drolleries. A Gothic page might contain several areas and types of decoration: a miniature in a frame, a historiated initial beginning a passage of text, and a border with drolleries. Often different artists worked on the different parts of the decoration.

Paints 
While the use of gold is by far one of the most captivating features of illuminated manuscripts, the bold use of varying colors provided multiple layers of dimension to the illumination. From a religious perspective, "the diverse colors wherewith the book is illustrated, not unworthily represent the multiple grace of heavenly wisdom."

The medieval artist's palette was broad; a partial list of pigments is given below. In addition, unlikely-sounding substances such as urine and earwax were used to prepare pigments.

Gilding 

On the strictest definition, a manuscript is not considered "illuminated" unless one or many illuminations contained metal, normally gold leaf or shell gold paint, or at least was brushed with gold specks.  Gold leaf was from the 12th century usually polished, a process known as burnishing. The inclusion of gold alludes to many different possibilities for the text. If the text is of religious nature lettering in gold is a sign of exalting the text. In the early centuries of Christianity, “Gospel manuscripts were sometimes written entirely in gold". The gold ground style, with all or most of the background in gold, was taken from Byzantine mosaics and icons.  Aside from adding rich decoration to the text, scribes during the time considered themselves to be praising God with their use of gold.  Furthermore, gold was used if a patron who had commissioned a book to be written wished to display the vastness of his riches. Eventually, the addition of gold to manuscripts became so frequent, "that its value as a barometer of status with the manuscript was degraded". During this time period the price of gold had become so cheap that its inclusion in an illuminated manuscript accounted for only a tenth of the cost of production. By adding richness and depth to the manuscript, the use of gold in illuminations created pieces of art that are still valued today.

The application of gold leaf or dust to an illumination is a very detailed process that only the most skilled illuminators can undertake and successfully achieve. The first detail an illuminator considered when dealing with gold was whether to use gold leaf or specks of gold that could be applied with a brush. When working with gold leaf the pieces would be hammered and thinned until they were "thinner than the thinnest paper". The use of this type of leaf allowed for numerous areas of the text to be outlined in gold. There were several ways of applying gold to an illumination. One of the most popular included mixing the gold with stag's glue and then "pour it into water and dissolve it with your finger." Once the gold was soft and malleable in the water it was ready to be applied to the page. Illuminators had to be very careful when applying gold leaf to the manuscript because gold leaf is able to "adhere to any pigment which had already been laid, ruining the design, and secondly the action of burnishing it is vigorous and runs the risk of smudging any painting already around it."

Patrons
Monasteries produced manuscripts for their own use; heavily illuminated ones tended to be reserved for liturgical use in the early period, while the monastery library held plainer texts. In the early period manuscripts were often commissioned by rulers for their own personal use or as diplomatic gifts, and many old manuscripts continued to be given in this way, even into the Early Modern period. Especially after the book of hours became popular, wealthy individuals commissioned works as a sign of status within the community, sometimes including donor portraits or heraldry: "In a scene from the New Testament, Christ would be shown larger than an apostle, who would be bigger than a mere bystander in the picture, while the humble donor of the painting or the artist himself might appear as a tiny figure in the corner." The calendar was also personalized, recording the feast days of local or family saints. By the end of the Middle Ages many manuscripts were produced for distribution through a network of agents, and blank spaces might be reserved for the appropriate heraldry to be added locally by the buyer.

Though the first medieval creators of illuminated manuscripts were monasteries who did not produce them for widespread or commercial use, illuminated manuscripts eventually became a commercial product for “members of the ruling class and high-ranking church officials".

Illuminated manuscripts have been described as “a unique work of art and a testament to the beauty of God’s word”. Displaying the amazing detail and richness of a text, the addition of illumination was never an afterthought. The inclusion of illumination is twofold, it added value to the work, but more importantly it provides pictures for the illiterate members of society to "make the reading seem more vivid and perhaps more credible."

Modern illuminated manuscripts 
One notable modern illuminated manuscript is The Saint John's Bible, the first completely handwritten and illuminated Bible to be commissioned by a Benedictine abbey since the invention of the printing press. Production of the seven-volume illuminated Bible was finished in 2011. The Saint John's Bible is hand-written on vellum by quill, with 160 illuminations throughout the volumes.

Gallery

See also
 Arabic miniature
 Historiated initial
 Inhabited initial
 Islamic calligraphy
 International Association of Master Penmen, Engrossers and Teachers of Handwriting

References

Further reading
Alexander, Jonathan A.G., Medieval Illuminators and their Methods of Work, 1992, Yale UP, 
 Coleman, Joyce, Mark Cruse, and Kathryn A. Smith, eds. The Social Life of Illumination: Manuscripts, Images, and Communities in the Late Middle Ages (Series: Medieval Texts and Cultures in Northern Europe, vol. 21. Turnhout: Brepols Publishing, 2013). xxiv + 552 pp online review
Calkins, Robert G. Illuminated Books of the Middle Ages. 1983, Cornell University Press, 
 De Hamel, Christopher. A History of Illuminated Manuscript (Phaidon, 1986)
 De Hamel, Christopher. Medieval Craftsmen: Scribes and Illuminations. Buffalo: University of Toronto, 1992.
Kren, T. & McKendrick, Scot (eds), Illuminating the Renaissance – The Triumph of Flemish Manuscript Painting in Europe, Getty Museum/Royal Academy of Arts, 2003, 
 Liepe, Lena. Studies in Icelandic Fourteenth Century Book Painting, Reykholt: Snorrastofa, rit. vol. VI, 2009.
 Melo, M.J., Castro, R., Nabais, P. et al. The book on how to make all the colour paints for illuminating books: unravelling a Portuguese Hebrew illuminators’ manual' ' Herit Sci 6, 44 (2018). https://doi.org/10.1186/s40494-018-0208-z
Morgan, Nigel J., Stella Panayotova, and Martine Meuwese. Illuminated Manuscripts in Cambridge: A Catalogue of Western Book Illumination in the Fitzwilliam Museum and the Cambridge Colleges (London : Harvey Miller Publishers in conjunction with the Modern Humanities Association. 1999– )
Pächt, Otto, Book Illumination in the Middle Ages (trans fr German), 1986, Harvey Miller Publishers, London, 
 
 Wieck, Roger. "Folia Fugitiva: The Pursuit of the Illuminated Manuscript Leaf". The Journal of the Walters Art Gallery'', Vol. 54, 1996.

External links

Images
Illuminated Manuscripts in the J. Paul Getty Museum – Los Angeles
Illuminating the Manuscript Leaves  Digitized illuminated manuscripts from the University of Louisville Libraries
15 pages of illuminated manuscripts from the Ball State University Digital Media Repository
Digitized Illuminated Manuscripts – Complete sets of high-resolution archival images from the Walters Art Museum
 Collection of Armenian Illuminated Manuscripts – A full collection with high resolution images of Armenian Illuminated Manuscripts

Resources
UCLA Library Special Collections collection of Medieval and Renaissance manuscripts
British Library, catalogue of illuminated manuscripts
Collection of illuminated manuscripts. From the Koninklijke Bibliotheek and Museum Meermanno-Westreenianum in The Hague.
Demonstration of the production of an illuminated manuscript from the Fitzwilliam, Cambridge (Flash player needed)
CORSAIR. Thousands of digital images from the Morgan Library's renowned collection of medieval and Renaissance manuscripts
Manuscript Miniatures, a collection of illustrations from manuscripts made before 1450
A Collection of Indonesian Illuminated Manuscripts | Southeast Asia Digital Library

 
Books by type
Book arts
Book design
Book terminology
Christian genres
Gilding
.Illuminated
Textual scholarship
Western art